Liulin primarily refers to Liulin County (柳林县), Shanxi, China.

Liulin (柳林) may also refer to:

Towns 
 Liulin, Hui County, Gansu
 Liulin, Jonê County, Gansu
 Liulin, Hebei, in Neiqiu County
 Liulin, Zhengzhou, in Jinshui District, Zhengzhou, Henan
 Liulin, Sui County, in Sui County, Suizhou, Hubei
 Liulin, Chenggu County, Shaanxi
 Liulin, Fengxiang County, Shaanxi
 Liulin, Tongchuan, in Yaozhou District, Tongchuan, Shaanxi
 Liulin, Baota District, in Yan'an, Shaanxi
 Liulin, Liaocheng, in Guan County, Shandong
 Liulin, Juye County, Shandong
 Liulin, Shanxi, seat of Liulin County
 Liulin, Sichuan, in Bazhou District, Bazhong

Townships 
 Liulin Township, Henan, in Shihe District, Xinyang
 Liulin Township, Huangmei County, Hubei
 Liulin Township, Zhushan County, Hubei

Other 
 Liulin, Bofan, a village in Bofan, Anlu, Xiaogan, Hubei
 Liulin station, a metro station in the city of Zhengzhou in China